Aleksandrs Kulakovs (born 4 March 1956 in Dedinovo) is a former Latvian football goalkeeper who played for the biggest part of his career for Daugava Rīga.

At the age of 15 Kulakovs was the first goalkeeper for Spartak Lukhovitsy. After having seen him play for the Russian SFSR team Konstantin Beskov offered Kulakovs to move to the reserves squad for FC Dynamo Moscow. In 1974, he moved to VEF Rīga in Latvia and won the Latvian championship in 1974 and 1975.

In 1976, he moved to Daugava Rīga, the top club in Soviet Latvia which at the time played in the second division of Soviet football. In the first seasons he had to battle for his position on the field with Laimonis Laizāns and Rolands Žagars but soon he became the undisputed number one goalie for Daugava. From 1977 to 1989 he played in 330 for Daugava and was succeeded by Oļegs Karavajevs in the club. In 1991 with Forums Skonto Kulakovs won the Latvian league. Kulakovs also played in a one international game for Latvia in 1992.

Kulakovs retired from playing and moved to coaching. He currently is the goalkeeper coach for FC Skonto and Latvia national team.

References

1956 births
People from Lukhovitsky District
Living people
Latvian footballers
Latvia international footballers
Daugava Rīga players
Association football goalkeepers